Giraffes on Horseback Salad, also called The Surrealist Woman, was a screenplay written in 1937 by Salvador Dalí for the Marx Brothers. It was to be a love story between a Spanish aristocrat named "Jimmy" (to be played by Harpo Marx, with whom Dalí was friends) and a "beautiful surrealist woman, whose face is never seen by the audience". Dalí considered that the central theme of the film would be "the continuous struggle between the imaginative life as depicted in the old myths and the practical and rational life of contemporary society" and hoped that the film score could be written by Cole Porter.

The film was never produced. Harper's Magazine posits that this was because Metro-Goldwyn-Mayer, the Marx Brothers' studio at the time, considered it to be too surreal: proposed scenes included giraffes wearing gas masks on fire, and Harpo Marx using a butterfly net to capture "the eighteen smallest dwarfs in the city". Serena Davies, writing in the Telegraph, said that Groucho Marx felt that the proposed film was not funny.  Tate Modern curator Matthew Gale has suggested that Dali may have considered an actual production to be beside the point.

For several years, the screenplay to Giraffes was thought to be lost. In 1991-92, New York City theater collective Elevator Repair Service produced Marx Brothers on Horseback Salad, combining scenes from an attempted reconstruction of the screenplay (based partially on having "watched every Marx Brothers film they could find") with scenes of Dalí's real-life interactions with Harpo Marx and Susan Fleming. In 1996, the actual screenplay was found amid Dalí's personal papers.

In March 2019, a Giraffes on Horseback Salad graphic novel was released by Quirk Books.  On July 26, 2019, a "soundtrack" to the graphic novel was released with music by Quin Arbeitman and Pepe Deluxé, with Frank Ferrante as Groucho and Matt Roper as Chico.

A poster for the abandoned film was produced by designer Fernando Reza in 2019.

References

External links
 

Film with screenplays by Salvador Dalí
Marx Brothers (film series)
Unproduced screenplays